Austromatthaea is a genus of plants in the family Monimiaceae. As of 2010, it is considered monospecific. The sole species, Austromatthaea elegans, is found in Queensland.

References

External links 
 

 Austromatthaea elegans at The Plant List
 Austromatthaea at Tropicos

Monimiaceae
Monimiaceae genera
Monotypic Laurales genera
Flora of Queensland
Laurales of Australia